The abaya "cloak" (colloquially and more commonly, especially in Literary Arabic:  ; plural), sometimes also called an aba, is a simple, loose over-garment, essentially a robe-like dress, worn by some women in parts of the Muslim world including North Africa, the Arabian Peninsula, and most of the Middle East. 
Traditional abayat are black and may be either a large square of fabric draped from the shoulders or head or a long kaftan. The abaya covers the whole body except the head, feet, and hands. It can be worn with the niqāb, a face veil covering all but the eyes. Some women also wear long black gloves, so their hands are covered as well. It is common that the abaya is worn on special occasions, such as Mosque visits and Islamic Holiday celebrations for Eid al-Fitr and Eid al-Adha. The Indonesian traditional dress kebaya gets its name from the abaya.

Rationale

The rationale for the abaya is often attributed to the Quranic quote, "O Prophet, tell your wives and daughters, and the believing women, to cover themselves with a loose garment. They will thus be recognised and no harm will come to them" (Qur'an 33:59, translated by Ahmed Ali). This quotation is often given as the argument for wearing the abaya.

The abaya is most common in countries with large Muslim populations. Some denominations of Islam consider the entire female body, except for the face and hands, awrah – that which should be concealed in public from males unrelated by blood or marriage.

Countries
Outside some Arab states such as Saudi Arabia, UAE, and Qatar, the abaya is not widely worn by Muslim women. It is common in countries like Indonesia, India and Pakistan. Abaya also refers to different garments in different countries. In Arab states of the Persian Gulf, they tend to be black in color.

Saudi Arabia
In Saudi Arabia, women were required to cover in public. However, in March 2018, the Crown Prince Mohammad bin Salman claimed that women could choose what to wear in public, provided it met certain standards, when he stated, "The decision is entirely left for women to decide what type of decent and respectful attire she chooses to wear".

Styles
Abayat are known by various names but serve the same purpose, which is to cover. Contemporary models are usually caftans, cut from light, flowing fabrics like crepe, georgette, and chiffon. Other known styles are front open and front closed abaya. Styles differ from region to region: some abayat have embroidery on black fabric while others are brightly coloured and have different forms of artwork across them.

Aba 
Aba was also a cloth. A coarse woolen fabric was woven from wool or camel's hair. It was dyed in vibrant shades and incorporated into Abaya.

See also

Islam and clothing 
Types of hijab

References

External links
A Brief History of the Abaya 
Kaur-Jones, Priya. "Reinventing the Saudi abaya." BBC. 12 May 2011.
History of Abaya. "History of Abaya."

Arabic clothing
Dresses
Outerwear
Islamic female clothing